Anthony Chan may refer to:

 Anthony Chan (actor) (born 1952), Hong Kong actor
 Anthony Chan (economist) (born 1950s), chief economist at JPMorgan Chase & Co.